George Waverly Vest Sr. (December 17, 1907 – November 15, 1997) was an American football and basketball coach. He served as the head football coach at Southwest Texas State Teachers College—now known as Texas State University–from 1946 to 1950, compiling a record of 30–17–3. Vest was also the head basketball coach at Southwest Texas State from 1939 to 1942, tallying a mark of 36–29.

Vest was born on December 17, 1907, in Martindale, Texas. He attended Southwest Texas State Teachers College, where he played football, basketball, and baseball and ran track before graduating in 1929 with a Bachelor of Science degree in chemistry. He later earned a master's degree in physical education from the University of Texas at Austin. Vest began his coaching career in Donna, Texas, mentoring the junior high school football team. He was promoted to head football coach at Donna High School in 1933. Vest returned to his alma mater, Southwest Texas State, in 1937 as an assistant coach.

Vest enlisted in the United States Army on July 13, 1942, and then attended Officer Candidate School. He served during World War II in Karachi, reaching the rank of major before his discharge in 1946. Vest died on November 15, 1997, in Houston.

Head coaching record

Football

References

External links
 

1907 births
1997 deaths
American football fullbacks
American male high jumpers
Baseball catchers
Texas State Bobcats baseball coaches
Texas State Bobcats football coaches
Texas State Bobcats football players
Texas State Bobcats men's basketball coaches
Texas State Bobcats men's basketball players
Texas State Bobcats men's track and field athletes
College men's tennis players in the United States
High school football coaches in Texas
University of Texas at Austin alumni
United States Army officers
United States Army personnel of World War II
People from Caldwell County, Texas
Coaches of American football from Texas
Players of American football from Texas
Baseball players from Texas
Basketball coaches from Texas
Basketball players from Texas
Tennis people from Texas
Track and field athletes from Texas
Military personnel from Texas